The Storms was an electric cycle-car produced by the William E Storms company in Detroit, MI in 1915.  It was thought to be the only American electric cycle-car.   They produced a two-seater or three-seater body, costing between $750 to $950.

References
 

Defunct motor vehicle manufacturers of the United States
Motor vehicle manufacturers based in Michigan
Defunct manufacturing companies based in Detroit